In Greek mythology, Abarbaree or Abarbarea (Ancient Greek: Ἀβαρβαρέα means 'unmuddy') was the naiad nymph of the meadows of the river, Aesepus, her river-god father.

Family 
Abarbarea was the wife of Bucolion (the eldest but illegitimate son of the Trojan king Laomedon) and had twin sons by him, Aesepus and Pedasus, who were killed by Euryalus during the Trojan War.

 "Then Euryalus slew Dresus and Opheltius, and went on after Aesepus and Pedasus, whom on a time the fountain-nymph Abarbarea bare to peerless Bucolion. Now Bucolion was son of lordly Laomedon, his eldest born, though the mother that bare him was unwed; he while shepherding his flocks lay with the nymph in love, and she conceived and bare twin sons."

Mythology 
Before her marriage to Bucolion, Abarbarea often reproached Nicaea for having killed the mortal ox-herder Hymnus.
 "The Nymph of the mountain was sore offended at manslaying Nicaia, and lamented over the body of Hymnos; in her watery hall the girl of Rhyndacos groaned, carried along barefoot by the water; the Naiads wept, and up in Sipylos, the neighbouring rock of Niobe groaned yet more with tears that flow uncalled; the youngest girl of all, still unacquainted with wedded love, not yet having come to Bucolion's pallet, the Naiad Abarbarea oft reproached the nymph..."

Notes

References 

Bell, Robert E., Women of Classical Mythology: A Biographical Dictionary. ABC-Clio. 1991. .
Homer, The Iliad with an English Translation by A.T. Murray, Ph.D. in two volumes. Cambridge, MA., Harvard University Press; London, William Heinemann, Ltd. 1924. . Online version at the Perseus Digital Library.
Homer, Homeri Opera in five volumes. Oxford, Oxford University Press. 1920. . Greek text available at the Perseus Digital Library.
Nonnus of Panopolis, Dionysiaca translated by William Henry Denham Rouse (1863-1950), from the Loeb Classical Library, Cambridge, MA, Harvard University Press, 1940.  Online version at the Topos Text Project.
Nonnus of Panopolis, Dionysiaca. 3 Vols. W.H.D. Rouse. Cambridge, MA., Harvard University Press; London, William Heinemann, Ltd. 1940–1942. Greek text available at the Perseus Digital Library.

Naiads

Women in Greek mythology